Gergely Gulyás (born 21 September 1981) is a Hungarian jurist, politician, the current Minister of the Prime Minister's Office since 2018. He is a member of the Fidesz and has been member of the National Assembly (MP) since 2010.

Political career
Gulyás was first elected to the Országház in 2010.

Gulyás was a deputy chairman of the Committee for Human Rights, Minorities, Civic and Religious Affairs of the Hungarian Parliament. and participated in formulation of the new constitution of Hungary in 2011 that was seen controversial by the political powers in opposition. After several protests he said that "despite political debates we think it is an important value that for the first time, a freely elected parliament created the Basic Law".

In October 2011 Gulyás also co-wrote "lex Biszku" bill which aims was to hold people who were responsible for post-1956 reprisals and law-enforcement officials accountable for their inhumane actions. He stated during a news conference in October 2011 that the party’s proposal for a solution was constitutional and in line with international law.

In his second term, Gulyás was appointed Deputy Speaker of the National Assembly responsible for the Legislation on 6 May 2014. 

In his third term which coincided with the Fourth Orbán Government, Gulyás was named Minister of the Prime Minister's Office.

In the Fifth Orbán Government, Gulyás retained his position.

Partisan positions
He was elected one of the four vice-presidents of the Fidesz party on 13 December 2015, holding the position until 29 September 2019. 

Gulyás became leader of the Fidesz parliamentary group on 2 October 2017, replacing Lajos Kósa.

Political stances
On 13 January 2023 while the 2022 Russian invasion of Ukraine was raging, Gulyás stated that Hungary would decline to allow the transit of Leopard 2 tanks by NATO countries to Ukraine, "because it does not want to endanger ethnic Hungarians living in the Zakarpattia region of Ukraine." The Hungarian publication Hirado published a video of the press conference on its website.

References

External links
 Országgyűlés biography 

1981 births
Living people
Hungarian jurists
Fidesz politicians
Government ministers of Hungary
Members of the National Assembly of Hungary (2010–2014)
Members of the National Assembly of Hungary (2014–2018)
Members of the National Assembly of Hungary (2018–2022)
Members of the National Assembly of Hungary (2022–2026)
Members of the Fourth Orbán Government
Politicians from Budapest
Members of the fifth Orbán government
Legislative deputy speakers